Maurice James Escovilla Shaw (born January 8, 1985) is a Filipino-American professional basketball player for the Manila City Stars of the Pilipinas Super League. In Shaw's early years, he attended Washington Union High School in Fresno County, California. After high school, he began his professional career playing for the world famous Harlem Globetrotters, while attending Hutchinson Community College simultaneously.

High school
Shaw began his high school career at Washington Union High School in Fresno County, California playing alongside Deshawn Stevenson. During his freshman year, he was ranked as one of the top 5 centers on the West Coast, and by the end of the year, was ranked among the best freshman basketball players in the country. During his sophomore year, the Sporting News magazine honored Shaw as one of top 20 players in the country, alongside LeBron James.

In 2002, Shaw attended the Nike All-American camp.  He later transferred to Bridgton Academy prep school in North Bridgton, Maine where he averaged 20 points and 11 rebounds.  During his time at Bridgton, Shaw participated in the Pittsburgh World Classic and played on the USA team. After prep school, he entered the 2004 draft where he worked out with the Seattle SuperSonics, and later withdrew. Shaw then played for Hutchinson college for a brief period before joining the Harlem Globetrotters.

Professional career

Harlem Globetrotters and early career
Shaw's professional career began in 2005 with the Harlem Globetrotters. During his season with the Globetrotters, he appeared in the Harlem Globetrotters World Tour Nintendo DS game. Following his 2005-2006 season with the Globetrotters, Shaw went on to play for Associação Académica de Coimbra in Portugal where he led his team to the playoffs after a losing season. After playing internationally, Shaw returned to the United States and played for the Minot SkyRockets in the CBA during the 2008-2009 season. The following year, Shaw played for the Tacoma Tide in the IBL and also played for the Seattle Mountaineers in 2010.

Hiatus from basketball and NFL career
After a three-year absence, Shaw resurfaced and made national headlines for participating in the 2013 NFL regional combine at the Seattle Seahawks headquarters by running a 4.81 in 40 yard dash. Shaw later worked with the Oakland Raiders during OTA's where he had a meeting with the staff and tight end coach Mark Hutson.

Return to basketball
In 2016, Shaw made his return to basketball as the starting forward for the Dunkin' Raptors in the Thailand Basketball League. Shaw suffered a groin injury early in the season but managed to return and average a double-double for the remainder of the season.

Shaw stayed in Thailand, and played for Filipino club Kabayan, norming 17.2 points, 11.3 rebounds, and a 44.7 FG% rate per game. Shaw finished the second half of the season with PEA, where he tallied 22.6 points, 14.6 rebounds, and 48.2 FG% per game.

PBA career
Shaw, who has Filipino heritage through his mother, declared for the 2019 PBA draft, where he was the tallest and one of the oldest members of the draft class. Shaw was eventually picked second overall by the Blackwater Elite in the regular draft of the 2019 draft. After the 2020 season, Maurice Shaw was traded to the NLEX Road Warriors, but he never played a game for the team.

In 2021, after a buyout with the NLEX Road Warriors, Shaw signed a contract with the Barangay Ginebra San Miguel for the remainder of the 2021 PBA Governors' Cup. On March 15, 2022, he was placed in the unrestricted free agent list, without appearing a game for the team.

Career statistics

Notes

References

1985 births
Living people
American expatriate basketball people in Brazil
American expatriate basketball people in Thailand
American men's basketball players
Basketball players from Laguna (province)
Blackwater Bossing draft picks
Blackwater Bossing players
Centers (basketball)
Filipino men's 3x3 basketball players
Filipino men's basketball players
Filipino people of African-American descent
Harlem Globetrotters players
Junior college men's basketball players in the United States
People from Biñan
Power forwards (basketball)
Sportspeople from Fresno, California